Shenzhen Huayi Experimental School (formerly known as Huashiyifuzhong Experimental School in Bao'an District, Shenzhen) was established in September 2005 and was created by Shenzhen Yuqi Investment Co., Ltd. It is a nine-year privately run school that integrates primary school and junior high school.

External links
 Official Website

Bao'an District
Experimental schools
Schools in Shenzhen